When the Lights Go on Again is a 1944 American drama film directed by William K. Howard and written by Milton Lazarus. The film stars Jimmy Lydon, Barbara Belden, Regis Toomey, George Cleveland, Grant Mitchell and Dorothy Peterson. The film was released on October 23, 1944, by Producers Releasing Corporation.

Plot

Cast      
Jimmy Lydon as Ted Benson
Barbara Belden as Arline Cary
Regis Toomey as Bill Regan 
George Cleveland as Pat 'Gramps' Benson
Grant Mitchell as Arnold Benson
Dorothy Peterson as Clara Benson
Harry Shannon as Tom Cary
Lucien Littlefield as Andy
Joseph Crehan as Bob
Luis Alberni as Joe
Warren Mills as Joey Benson
Emmett Lynn as Tramp
Jill Browning as Peggy

References

External links
 

1944 films
American drama films
Producers Releasing Corporation films
Films directed by William K. Howard
American black-and-white films
1944 drama films
1940s English-language films
1940s American films